Namia (Namie, Nemia) is a Sepik language spoken in Namea Rural LLG, Sandaun Province, Papua New Guinea. It goes by various names, such as Edawapi, Lujere, Yellow River. Language use is "vigorous" (Ethnologue).

In Sandaun Province, it is spoken in Ameni, Edwaki, Iwane, Lawo, Pabei, and Panewai villages in Namea Rural LLG, and in the Wiyari area. It is also spoken in 19 villages of Yellow River District in East Sepik Province.

Dialects
Namie dialect groups are:

Ailuaki: spoken in Yegarapi, Yaru, and Norambalip villages
Amani: spoken in Augwom, Iwani, Pabei, Panewai, and Tipas villages
Wiari: spoken in Alai, Nami, Worikori, Akwom, and Naum villages
Lawo: spoken in Mokwidami, Mantopai, Yawari, and Aiendami villages

Phonology
Namia has only 10 phonemic consonants:

{| class="wikitable" style="text-align:center"
!colspan="2"| !! Labial !! Alveolar !! Palatal !! Velar
|-
!colspan="2"| Nasal
|  ||  ||  || 
|-
!colspan="2"| Plosive
|  ||  ||  || 
|-
!rowspan="2"| Nasal
! 
|  ||  ||  || 
|-
! 
|  ||  ||  || 
|-
!colspan="2"| Semivowel
|  ||  ||  || 
|}

/t/ and /r/ are in nearly perfect complementary distribution with each other.

There are 6 vowels in Namia:

{| class="wikitable" style="text-align:center"
! !! Front !! Central !! Back
|-
! Close
|  ||  || 
|-
! Mid
|  ||  || 
|-
! Open
|  ||  || 
|}

Grammar
Unlike other Sepik languages, Namia has an inclusive-exclusive distinction for the first-person pronoun, which could possibly be due to diffusion from Torricelli languages. Inclusive-exclusive first-person pronominal distinctions are also found in the Yuat languages and Grass languages.

Vocabulary
The following basic vocabulary words are from Foley (2005) and Laycock (1968), as cited in the Trans-New Guinea database:

{| class="wikitable sortable"
! gloss !! Namia
|-
! head
| magu
|-
! ear
| mak
|-
! eye
| eno
|-
! nose
| nəmala; nɨmala
|-
! tooth
| pinarɨ; pinarə
|-
! tongue
| lar
|-
! leg
| liː; lipala
|-
! louse
| nanpeu
|-
! dog
| ar; ara
|-
! pig
| lwae
|-
! bird
| eyu
|-
! egg
| puna
|-
! blood
| norə
|-
! bone
| lak
|-
! skin
| urarə
|-
! breast
| mu
|-
! tree
| mi
|-
! man
| lu
|-
! woman
| ere
|-
! sun
| wuluwa
|-
! moon
| yem
|-
! water
| ijo; ito
|-
! fire
| ipi
|-
! stone
| lijei
|-
! name
| ilei
|-
! eat
| (t)
|-
! one
| tipia
|-
! two
| pəli
|}

References

Yellow River languages
Languages of East Sepik Province
Languages of Sandaun Province